The Crickheath Tramway was a 1.5-mile-long,  narrow gauge industrial railway connecting the Porth-y-waen lime quarries near Llanymynech to the Crickheath Wharf (near Pant, Shropshire) on the Ellesmere Canal's Llanymynech branch. It opened in the 1820s and closed in 1913.

References

Sources 
 

2 ft 6 in gauge railways in Wales
Horse-drawn railways
Railway lines closed in 1913
Rail transport in Shropshire